Torqueola monophaes is a moth in the family Crambidae. It was described by Oswald Bertram Lower in 1902. It is found in Australia.

References

Moths described in 1902
Spilomelinae